Superman: Brainiac Attacks is a 2006 American animated superhero film from Warner Bros. Animation. Released on June 20, 2006 as a marketing tie in with Superman Returns, the film features Superman battling the forces of Lex Luthor and Brainiac, and his relationship with Lois Lane.

Plot
Brainiac crash lands on Earth and hijacks Lex Labs to collect Earth's data and amass the power of its weapons systems. Lois Lane and Jimmy Olsen are sent to one of Lex Luthor's laboratories after Brainiac arrives on Earth on a meteor, successfully dodging the attempts made by Luthor's satellite to destroy any potential damage to the Earth in an attempt to boost his popularity against Superman as the true hero of the people. Superman shortly arrives and finds Brainiac downloading data from the computers with information relating the various forms of weaponry from LexCorp, including the laser-equipped meteor shield that had attempted to destroy Brainiac earlier. Using his ice breath, Superman is able to seemingly destroy Brainiac, after Superman and Brainiac had engaged in battle.

Witnessing the incident, and how his satellite could be used as an effective weapon against Superman, Luthor finds Brainiac's still intact brain chip and takes it to LexCorp, where he reactivates Brainiac. He then proposes that Brainiac, with the technology of LexCorp as well as Kryptonite, defeat Superman, and then Luthor step in to chase Brainiac away from the Earth, in front of the world to make him appear as Earth's true hero, where he will then be free to conquer other planets, leaving Lex in charge of Earth. Brainiac accepts the agreement, and proceeds to rebuilding and improving himself.

Meanwhile, Clark Kent contemplates the idea of revealing his secret identity to Lois. The opportunity presents itself when editor Perry White, due to staff shortages, sends both Kent and Lois to review a restaurant in Metropolis. During this time, however, Brainiac returns. Among his improvements is the ability to track down Superman based on his DNA. After another battle with Brainiac, Superman has been significantly affected by Brainiac's kryptonite power rays, and Lois is critically injured in the process. It is revealed that her blood has been infected with a kryptonite, metallic-based poison, that is galvanizing her blood cells and if not treated, would prove fatal.

Feeling guilty, Superman obtains a sample of Lois' blood from the hospital and returns to the Fortress of Solitude where he analyzes Lois' blood using his Kryptonian technology. It is then when Superman discovers that the only cure for Lois' condition is to obtain a chemical substance, known as Argonium 44, from the Phantom Zone. However, Brainiac is able to locate Superman in his Antarctic retreat, and attempts to download the information of Krypton from Superman's computer. Superman then initiates a self-destruct sequence. Brainiac, not being able to locate Superman, presumes that he has been killed in the explosion. Superman had, in fact, gone into the Phantom Zone in order to find the Argonium 44, which would not only cure Lois and heal himself, but provide him with increased strength against Brainiac by shielding him from his kryptonite blast.

Brainiac returns to Metropolis where Luthor awaits in order to fulfill their agreement. Jimmy investigates Lex and realizes that he is working with Brainiac. Brainiac, however, intends to kill Luthor in order to conquer Earth, and had even removed the self-destructive component that Luthor had planted should Brainiac double cross him. Superman seemingly returns through a portal and cures Lois, but when bringing her out of the hospital, he realizes this experience is an illusion created by the Phantom Zone when Lois repeatedly goads him to stay with her and not go after Brainiac. After this, he is chased and attacked by several Phantoms before he actually escapes the Phantom Zone.

Returning to Metropolis, Superman and Brainiac engage in a lengthy battle, during which Luthor is injured in the crossfire. Mercy discovers Jimmy looking for evidence against Luthor and brutally attacks him. Eventually he takes over one of Lex's large, robotic exoskeletons and knocks her unconscious. Unfortunately, his camera is destroyed by his attack, relieving him of the chance to photograph evidence of Lex's schemes, much to his dismay. Superman seemingly defeats Brainiac and then returns to the hospital in order to cure the ailing Lois. But before Lois can take the cure, Braniac, who is now only a head, attacks the hospital and smashes the cure. Immediately afterwards, Superman finally destroys Brainiac by breaking his brain chip.
 
With the cure now destroyed, Lois faces certain death. Superman, regretting never telling Lois his true feelings then embraces her. It is then that his tears, containing Argonium 44 that had healed him earlier, makes contact with Lois, curing her. She presumes him to be Clark, but Superman, (having changed his mind for her safety) tells her he is just Superman. Later, Superman recovers a piece of his destroyed Kryptonian technology where he aims to rebuild his fortress. He then vows to quit his job at the Daily Planet in an attempt to prevent future harm to his loved ones, should any of his enemies discover his secret identity.

The movie ends with an injured Luthor facing criminal prosecution after the discovery of LexCorp's involvement with Brainiac's attack, and Lois racing to cover the appearance of Mr. Mxyzptlk (whose name Perry White struggles to pronounce) in Metropolis. Seeing Lois' eagerness to put herself in harm's way in order to cover a story, Superman goes back on his earlier decision to quit the Daily Planet so that he can be with Lois, as well as Metropolis' protector against the most powerful threats from the universe.

Cast
 Tim Daly as Kal-El / Clark Kent / Superman
 Lance Henriksen as Brainiac
 Powers Boothe as Lex Luthor
 Dana Delany as Lois Lane
 George Dzundza as Perry White
 David Kaufman as Jimmy Olsen
 Mike Farrell as Jonathan Kent
 Shelley Fabares as Martha Kent
 Tara Strong as Mercy Graves

Production
The film was directed by Curt Geda, who worked on Superman: The Animated Series. The classic style was desired by Warner Bros, with Geda adding more humor and romance than previously explored in the animated series. Despite the film's visual style being the same as Superman: The Animated Series (as are the majority of its returning voice cast), writer Duane Capizzi has stated the film was not intended to be part of the DC Animated Universe. Additionally, DCAU cast members Clancy Brown (Lex Luthor), Corey Burton (Brainiac) and Lisa Edelstein (Mercy Graves) are absent from the film, with Powers Boothe (who voices Gorilla Grodd in the DCAU), Lance Henriksen and Tara Strong (who voices Batgirl in the DCAU) voicing their respective characters instead.

Notably, this depiction of Lex Luthor, rather than being the cold, calculating industrialist portrayed in Superman: The Animated Series, seems to incorporate elements of Gene Hackman's less serious portrayals of the character in live-action movies, making Luthor more light-hearted and darkly whimsical, going as far as to make jokes about the situations around him.

See also
List of animated feature-length films

References

External links

 Duane Capizzi on Superman: Brainiac Attacks, Interview Conducted by Jim Harvey
 Director Talks Superman: Brainiac Attacks
 Superman: Brainiac Attacks - IGN
 
 

2006 direct-to-video films
2006 films
Animated Superman films
Direct-to-video animated films based on DC Comics
Toonami
2000s American animated films
2000s animated superhero films
Films directed by Curt Geda
American children's animated superhero films
Films with screenplays by Duane Capizzi
2000s English-language films